The Durandal class was a group of four destroyers built for the French Navy between 1896 and 1900, used during the First World War. These vessels were France's first true destroyers rather than torpedo boats. Two units were launched in 1899 while another two followed in 1900.  Another four destroyers of the similar Samsun class were laid down in 1906 and completed in 1907 for the Ottoman Navy, they also served in the First World War.

Its hull had a turtleback bow to reduce water resistance, with two masts and two funnels.

The Durandal destroyers were laid down between 1896 and 1897 and completed between 1899 and 1900. Espingole struck a rock in the Bay of Cavalaire-sur-Mer off the South of France on 4 February 1903, which caused the ship to sink. The three remaining destroyers served through the First World War, operating in both the English Channel and the Mediterranean Sea. They were sold for scrap in 1921.

Durandal class 
All four were built by Normand at Le Havre. The first pair (Durandal and Hallebarde) were ordered on 25 August 1896. They had a turtledeck forecastle and a flying deck aft, with two masts and two funnels widely separated by their machinery. The second pair (Fauconneau and Espignole) differed by having a strengthened hull and a slightly raised bow.

  – launched 11 February 1899, stricken 7 April 1919.
  – launched 8 June 1899, stricken 4 March 1920.
  – launched 2 April 1900, stricken 15 January 1921.
  – launched 28 June 1900, ran aground and lost 4 February 1903.

Samsun class 

The Samsun-class destroyers had similar dimensions to the Durandal class, but had more powerful machinery, more powerful armament, higher top speed and shorter range.  Three of the four (Samsun, Yarhisar and Basra) were built by C A de la Gironde at Bordeaux, while Tasoz was built by Schneider at Nantes.  These ships suffered from mechanical problems due to poor maintenance and played little part in World War I.  It was estimated that none could exceed  in 1915.  The Yarhisar was sunk in 1915 and the three surviving ships were scrapped in 1949. Yarhisar was under the command of Lt. Cdr. Ahmet Hulusi and sank in the gulf of Izmit near Yalova on 3 December 1915 by the British submarine  under the command of Lt. Cdr. Martin Dunbar-Nasmith.  The torpedo struck the engine room and the ship was torn in two.  Forty-two of her crew (36 Turks and 6 Germans) died.

  – laid up in 1918, repaired and recommissioned in 1924–1925, decommissioned in 1932, BU in 1949.
  – sunk 3 December 1915, by the British submarine HMS E11.
  – laid up in 1918, repaired and recommissioned in 1924–1925, decommissioned in 1932, BU in 1949.
  – laid up in 1918, repaired and recommissioned in 1924–1925, decommissioned in 1932, BU in 1949.

References

Bibliography

 
 
 

 
Destroyer classes
Destroyers of the French Navy
World War I destroyers of France
Ship classes of the French Navy